The SEC women's basketball tournament (sometimes known simply as the SEC Tournament) is the conference tournament in women's basketball for the Southeastern Conference (SEC). It is a single-elimination tournament that involves all league schools (currently 14 after the addition of two schools in 2012), and seeded based on regular season records.

The tournament was first held in 1980, and originally determined the conference champion. Even after the SEC began a uniform conference schedule in the 1982–83 season, the tournament continued to determine the official conference champion through the 1985 edition. Starting in the 1985–86 season, the SEC began awarding its official conference championship solely to the team(s) with the best regular-season record. This change brought SEC women's basketball in line with men's basketball, in which the SEC has awarded its official conference title based on regular-season record since the 1950–51 season.

Under the current format, the bottom four teams in the conference play first-round games, while the top four teams receive a "double-bye" and do not play until the quarterfinals.

History

Tournament championships by school

References